Litsa Kouroupaki (born in 1964) is a Greek politician and member of the Hellenic Parliament for the Panhellenic Socialist Movement (PASOK).

Life
Litsa Kouroupaki studied at the School of Dentistry of the National and Kapodistrian University of Athens, graduating in 1988.

Litsa Kouroupaki was a member of PASP, the youth wing of PASOK during her studies and became a member of PASOK itself since 1982. Within PASOK, she has been active in the health, volunteerism, immigration policy and human rights sections for the Athens party organization, and is a member of the Secretariat of the party section for the Greek diaspora.

References
 Biography of Litsa Kouroupaki 
 Litsa Kouroupaki in the Official Website of the Hellenic Parliament  -

External links
 Official Website of Litsa Kouroupaki 

1964 births
PASOK politicians
Living people
Greek MPs 2009–2012
People from Chania (regional unit)
Cretan women
National and Kapodistrian University of Athens alumni
21st-century Greek politicians
21st-century Greek women politicians